Det Hoffensbergske Etablissement was a publishing house and printing business based at Kronprinsessegade 28 in Copenhagen, Denmark.

History
The company was founded 1844 when Julius Hoffensberg (1828-1895) took over a small lithography workshop after a deceased brother. In 1874 this company merged with Otto Schwarts Eftf.s Boghandel (founded 1865) and Em. Bærentzen & Co.  (founded 1838) under the name Hoffensberg Jespersen & Trap. The book printing business  G. S. Eibes Bogtrykkeri (founded 1859) was also part of the merger. I. P. Trap's son, Frederik  Trap;, took over his father's share over the company later that same year. The name of the company was changed to Hoffenberg & Trao when E. Jespersen left the company in 1878.  Trap died in 1882, leaving Hoffensberg as the sole proprietor until he was joined by Alfred Grut 1887 in 1898. When Hoffensberg returned in 1888. Grut was instead joined by P. Poulsen but he died the following year. In 1890, the company was converted into a limited company (aktieselskab).

Location
The company was based at Kronprinsessegade 28 in Copenhagen.

See also
 Hagen & Sievertsen

References

Printing companies of Denmark
Danish companies established in 1844